Street Sk8er - known in PAL territories  as Street Skater - is a skateboarding video game for the PlayStation. It was first released in Japan in 1998 under the name , then was licensed by Electronic Arts for distribution in 1999. It was re-released later in Japan as part of the Simple 1500 series of budget games under the name The Skateboard. It was released on the PlayStation 3 in Europe as a download via the PlayStation Store in May 2008.

Gameplay 
Players attempt to clear each track by scoring a minimum number of points within a set time limit. The tracks consist of obstacles to perform tricks on, including rails, benches and half-pipes. By clearing a stage the player earns experience points that can be used to make the skater faster, more agile, able to jump higher, etc.

Soundtrack 

The game's soundtrack features music by various punk bands, including:
 H2O - "Everready" & "Thicker Than Water"
 Less Than Jake - "Sugar in Your Gas Tank" & "All My Best Friends Are Metalheads"
 The Pietasters - "Out All Night"
 I Against I - "Maybe Tomorrow" & "Ordinary Fight"
 Gas Huffer - "Rotten Egg"
 Straight Faced - "Against"
 All - "Honey Peeps"
 Weston - "Liz Phair"
 Plastilina Mosh - "Monster Truck" & "Encendedor"
 Bow & Arrow - World Is Breaking (this appears on the demo stage)
All other music composed by Toshiyuki Kakuta.

The game disc could be inserted into any CD player with the entire soundtrack playable.

Reception 

The game received mixed reviews according to the review aggregation website GameRankings. Next Generation said that the game was "mildly diverting, but it just isn't polished enough to be a standout title. Skateboarding fans will just have to keep playing 720° until a triple-A skating title hits the market." In Japan, Famitsu gave it a score of 26 out of 40.

Sequel 
A sequel called Street Sk8er 2 was released in 2000.

Notes

References

External links 
 

1998 video games
Atelier Double games
Electronic Arts games
Microcabin games
Multiplayer and single-player video games
PlayStation (console) games
PlayStation Network games
Skateboarding video games
Video games developed in Japan